Delta Pictoris, Latinized from δ Pictoris, is a binary star system in the southern constellation Pictor. It is visible to the naked with a combined apparent visual magnitude of 4.72. The system is located at a distance of approximately 1,300 light years from the Sun based on parallax measurements, and is drifting further away with a radial velocity of ~31 km/s. It is a runaway star system that is generating a bow shock as it moves through the interstellar medium.

The binary nature of this system was discovered by R. E. Wilson in 1914, then it was found to be variable by A. W. J. Cousins in 1951. A. D. A. Thackeray published orbital elements for the pair in 1966, showing they form an eclipsing double-lined spectroscopic binary with an orbital period of 1.67 days in essentially a circular orbit. The low inclination of the orbital plane results in shallow eclipses. The system is classified as a likely Beta Lyrae-type eclipsing binary with a peak magnitude of 4.65, which drops to 4.90 during the primary eclipse and 4.83 in the secondary eclipse. It is probably a detached binary system with no circumstellar material being found.

Both components of this system are massive main sequence stars with a combined stellar classification of B1/2(III)n. One member of the pair displays β Cep type pulsational behavior. Mass estimates give a primary with 16.3 times the mass of the Sun and a secondary with about half that.

References

B-type main-sequence stars
Spectroscopic binaries
Beta Lyrae variables
Beta Cephei variables

Pictor (constellation)
Pictoris, Delta
Durchmusterung objects
042933
029276
2212